Frederik Colberg (born 31 March 1993) is a Danish badminton player from Holbæk. He won his first international title at the 2010 Iceland International tournament in the mixed doubles event partnered with Mette Poulsen. Colberg was part of the Danish junior team that won a bronze medal at the 2011 European Junior Championships. Teamed-up with Rasmus Fladberg, they managed to claim the men's doubles title at the 2017 National Championships, and some international titles in the 2016 Yonex / K&D Graphics, 2017 Belgian, and Hungarian International tournaments; and also won the 2018 Spanish International partnered with Joachim Fischer Nielsen.

Achievements

BWF International Challenge/Series 
Men's doubles

Mixed doubles

  BWF International Challenge tournament
  BWF International Series tournament
  BWF Future Series tournament

References

External links 
 

1993 births
Living people
People from Holbæk Municipality
Danish male badminton players
Sportspeople from Region Zealand